Q, Mike, Slim, Daron is the sixth studio album by American band 112. It was released by eOne Music on October 27, 2017. Their debut with the label, it reached number 10 on the US Top Independent Albums chart.

Critical reception
Justin Kantor from SoulTracks found that "on the aptly titled Q, Mike, Slim, Daron, [112] aim to remind listeners of their trademark meshing of grooves for the streets and between the sheets. While they miss the mark a few times coming out of starting gate on several drab numbers filled with clichéd lyrics and vacuous arrangements, they manage to solidify the course throughout most of the CD’s following selections – if not exactly with the same spontaneity and edge that they once possessed."

Track listing

Charts

References 

2017 albums
112 (band) albums